Tigiria is a tehsil (block) of Cuttack district. There are 14 (panchayats) with a total of 50 villages under the Tigiria administrative division.

Tigiria is part of the Athagarh Odisha Vidhan Sabha constituency which includes as well Athagad, Athagarh block and 5 Gram panchayats (Kakhadi, Sankarpur, Badasamantarapur, Mangarajpur and Brahmapur) of Tangi-Chowdwar block.

History

During the British Raj era, Tigiria was the capital of Tigiria State. It was one of several princely states of the Eastern States Agency and the most densely populated one.

References

Cuttack district